The Rosa Khutor Alpine Resort is an alpine ski resort in Krasnodar Krai, Russia, located at the Aibga Ridge of the Western Caucasus along the Roza Khutor plateau near Krasnaya Polyana. Constructed from 2003 to 2011, it hosted the alpine skiing events for the 2014 Winter Olympics and Paralympics, based in nearby Sochi.

Elevations

Hotels

Rosa Khutor Alpine Ski Resort is the site of ten hotel projects with more than 1600 rooms.

World Cup 2012
Rosa Khutor hosted World Cup alpine races in the downhill and super combined for both men and women in February 2012, two years ahead of the Olympics. The race courses were designed by 1972 Olympic gold medalist Bernhard Russi.

The maximum gradient is 84% (40 degrees) at the top of the course. The 2012 downhill was won by Beat Feuz of Switzerland.

The first alpine test events were held in February 2011 on the European Cup circuit.

See also
 Rosa Khutor Extreme Park
 Khutor

References

External links

Olympstroy, the State Corporation for Construction of Olympic Venues and Sochi Development as Alpine Resort Construction information and technical characteristics
Ski Map.org - Rosa Khutor - trail maps from 2012, 2011, 2010, 2009
FIS Alpine.com - scheme of the Olympic alpine race courses - map with elevations
dailymotion.com - video - Rosa Khutor alpine test events - European Cup - February 18–25, 2011
The Extreme Sports Company
Extreme Hotel

Buildings and structures in Krasnodar Krai
Olympic alpine skiing venues
Ski areas and resorts in Russia
Sport in Krasnodar Krai
Sports venues in Russia
Tourist attractions in Krasnodar Krai
Venues of the 2014 Winter Olympics